Cane Creek is a  long 4th order tributary to the Haw River, in Alamance and Orange Counties, North Carolina.  This Cane Creek is on the left bank of the Haw River.

Course
Cane Creek rises on the divide between Cane Creek and Crabtree Creek (Eno River) about 2 miles east of Buckhorn, North Carolina in Orange County, North Carolina.  Cane Creek then flows southwest meet the Haw River about 2 miles east of Eli Whitney in Alamance County.

Watershed
Cane Creek drains  of area, receives about 46.9 in/year of precipitation, has a topographic wetness index of 415.16 and is about 59% forested.

See also
List of rivers of North Carolina

References

Rivers of North Carolina
Rivers of Alamance County, North Carolina
Rivers of Orange County, North Carolina